Mark Steadman may refer to:

 Mark Steadman (priest) (born 1974), Archdeacon of Stow
 Mark Steadman (novelist) (born 1930), American novelist